Ciudad Universitaria is an administrative neighborhood of Madrid belonging to the district of Moncloa-Aravaca.
It contains and is named after the University City of Madrid (Ciudad Universitaria de Madrid), a complex that is home to several  universities and various research organizations, including:

 Universidad Complutense de Madrid
 Universidad Politécnica de Madrid
 Universidad Nacional de Educación a Distancia
 Universidad Antonio de Nebrija
 Universidad Pontificia de Salamanca
 CUNEF (Colegio Universitario de Estudios Financieros)

Wards of Madrid
Moncloa-Aravaca